Mohammad Khalvandi (born 11 January 1990) is an Iranian athlete who competes in disability athletics in the F58 category. At the 2012 Paralympics, Khalvandi set a World Record for the F58 class with a throw of 50.98m as he won gold in the combined F57/58 category. Khalvandi also won the combined F57/58 javelin 2013 World title.

References

World record holders in Paralympic athletics
1990 births
Living people
Medalists at the 2012 Summer Paralympics
Athletes (track and field) at the 2012 Summer Paralympics
Medalists at the 2016 Summer Paralympics
Athletes (track and field) at the 2016 Summer Paralympics
Paralympic athletes of Iran
Paralympic gold medalists for Iran
Paralympic medalists in athletics (track and field)
Iranian male javelin throwers
21st-century Iranian people